The Cape Verdean records in swimming are the fastest ever performances of swimmers from Cape Verde, which are recognised and ratified by the Federacao Cabo-verdiana de Natacao (FECAN).

All records were set in finals unless noted otherwise.

Long Course (50 m)

Men

Women

Short Course (25 m)

Men

Women

References

Cape Verde
Records
Swimming